Hickling is a village and a civil parish in the English county of Norfolk. The village is 22 miles south-east of Cromer, 20.3 miles north-east of Norwich and 137 miles north-east of London. The village lies 3 miles east of the Broadlands town of Stalham. The nearest railway station is at Worstead for the Bittern Line which runs between Sheringham, Cromer and Norwich.

The villages name means 'Hicel's people' or perhaps, 'Hicel's place'.

The village comprises two main parts, Hickling Green and Hickling Heath. Hickling Heath is the part which usually attracts the most tourists who come on boat trips and moor up at the staithe.

Hickling village is situated on the edge of the Hickling Broads. By using the waterways it is possible to reach Catfield Dyke, Potter Heigham and even Great Yarmouth. Because it leads to the sea the waters are slightly tidal and, depending on the time of year, the water levels can heavily rise or fall. There are many thatched huts dotted along the broads, one of the oldest being Turner's Hut.

Hickling Mill, built on Hickling Heath in 1818, is a grade II* listed windmill which is one of the few to have been preserved in almost original condition, with most of the mechanism, apart from sails and fantail, relatively intact.

Adjacent to the village is the site of Hickling Priory, a house of Augustinian Canons which operated from 1185 to 1534. The 18th-century Hickling Hall was destroyed by fire in December 2014.

History
During the St. Lucia's flood in 1287 180 inhabitants died, when the seawater rose a foot above the high altar in the church.

References

 http://kepn.nottingham.ac.uk/map/place/Norfolk/Hickling

External links

 
Villages in Norfolk
Civil parishes in Norfolk
North Norfolk